Hannes Aigner (born 19 March 1989 in Augsburg) is a German slalom canoeist who has competed at the international level since 2006. He is a two-time Olympic bronze medalist.

Career
Aigner competed at three Olympic Games. He won a bronze medal in the K1 event at the 2012 Summer Olympics in London and again in the K1 event at the delayed 2020 Summer Olympics in Tokyo. He also finished fourth in the K1 event at the 2016 Summer Olympics in Rio de Janeiro.

Aigner won four gold medals at the ICF Canoe Slalom World Championships, one in the K1 event (2018) and three in the K1 team event (2010, 2011, 2022). He also won 9 medals at the European Championships (1 gold, 4 silvers and 4 bronzes).

World Cup individual podiums

References

 – accessed 12 September 2010.

External links

 
 
 
 
 

German male canoeists
Living people
1989 births
Olympic canoeists of Germany
Canoeists at the 2012 Summer Olympics
Canoeists at the 2016 Summer Olympics
Olympic bronze medalists for Germany
Olympic medalists in canoeing
Medalists at the 2012 Summer Olympics
Medalists at the 2020 Summer Olympics
Sportspeople from Augsburg
Medalists at the ICF Canoe Slalom World Championships
Canoeists at the 2020 Summer Olympics